Zsolt Semjén (born 8 August 1962) is a Hungarian politician. Member of Parliament between 1994 and 1998 and from 2002. Since 2003, he has been the chairman of the Christian Democratic People's Party. Minister without portfolio and Deputy Prime Minister in the second, third, fourth  and fifth cabinet of Prime Minister Viktor Orbán. Semjén has been the leader of the Christian Democratic People's Party (KDNP) since 2003, which formed a coalition and alliance with Fidesz.

Studies
After high school Semjén worked in the first half of the 1980s in industrial companies. He educated in theology at the Pázmány Péter Catholic University. In 1992 he graduated from sociology at the University. After that he attended Eötvös Loránd University in Budapest professionally bound with Budapest universities. In the second half of the 90s, he had his theology laureatus degree converted to a doctorate in religious studies, and was given an honorary assistant professorship at the university. In 2014, he obtained an MA degree in wildlife management from the Faculty of Forestry Engineering of the University of West Hungary.

Academic misconduct controversy
According to an article on 18 November 2012 by Heti Világgazdaság, Semjén committed acts of academic misconduct, as he allegedly plagiarised around 40% of his 1991 theological doctoral thesis, parts of which he also resubmitted as his sociology diploma dissertation in 1992.

Eötvös Loránd University, which awarded Semjén his degree in sociology, confirmed that there is a significant overlap between the works of Semjén and Molnár but that retroactive overriding of the awarding process is unlawful and so will maintain his degree. Pázmány Péter Catholic University did not conduct an investigation in the case, and announced that they consider the question closed, thus Semjén still has his PhD degree from that institution.

Political career

In 1989, during the political transition, he was among the founders of the Christian Democratic People's Party. He was a member of the executive committee and employee of the National Assembly. From 1990 to 1994 he served as district councilor. In 1994 he obtained a parliamentary seat in 1997, he was the deputy leader of KDNP. After the dissolution of the parliamentary faction of the KDNP, he joined the faction of the Hungarian Democratic Forum. In 1998, Viktor Orbán gave him the position of secretary of state for the church. During this period, an international church summit was organized in Hungary, the disputes with the Apostolic Holy See were settled, state funding of religious education was restored, an agreement was made with the historical churches, and the funding of church institutions performing public tasks was arranged equal to that of the state. In 2002 Zsolt Semjén returned to parliament from a list of Fidesz and the Democrats.

Soon, he rejoined the extra-parliamentary KDNP then, and in 2003 became chairman of this party. According to his program, the KDNP will remain an independent party in the Fidesz-led alliance that fully accepts the social doctrines of the Christian churches. Under his leadership, the KDNP formed a cooperation agreement with Fidesz in 2005. In 2006 he was re-elected to another parliamentary term and was later re-elected in 2010. In the second government of Viktor Orbán he became minister without portfolio and Deputy Prime Minister.

He and his wife represented the Hungarian government at the interment of the heart of former Hungarian Crown Prince Otto in Pannonhalma Archabbey, as the only persons present who were not Habsburg family members or clerics.

From May 29, 2010, he is the deputy prime minister of the second Orbán government, the first and general deputy of the prime minister, and the member of the cabinet responsible for national policy. 

On April 6, 2014, he received another mandate from second place in the joint national list of the governing parties. When the government was formed in June, he retained both of his posts - general deputy prime minister and minister without portfolio responsible for national policy. 

On April 8, 2018, the Fidesz-Christian Democratic People's Party - for the third time - won the parliamentary elections with a two-thirds majority, gaining another mandate from second place on the national list. In Viktor Orbán's fourth government, he is once again general deputy prime minister, minister of national politics, nationality policy, church politics, and church diplomacy.

During his government activities, he was one of the initiators of declaring Good Friday a public holiday. Zsolt Semjén was the submitter of the 1993 LV on Hungarian citizenship. amendment of the law. On November 10, 2017, he announced at the Hungarian Permanent Conference that the one millionth new Hungarian citizen had taken the oath. As a result of the preferential naturalization law, 940,000 people in the Carpathian Basin took the citizenship oath, while 160,000 people in the diaspora received Hungarian citizenship, i.e. 1.1 million became Hungarian citizens in ten years.

Eucharistic congress 
The International Eucharistic Congress opened in 2021 with the participation of János Áder and Zsolt Semjén. The Deputy Prime Minister also met Pope Francis, who visited Hungary for the event. Deputy Prime Minister Zsolt Semjén, Cardinal Péter Erdő, together with the Archbishop of Esztergom-Budapest, honored Archbishop Gallagher and Cardinal Parolin at the Hungarian Academy in Rome for their work for the Eucharistic Congress.

World Hunting Exhibition 
Zsolt Semjén gave the opening speech at the 2021 "ONE WITH NATURE" - World Hunting Exhibition, which was organized in honor of the 50th anniversary of the 1971 World Hunting Exhibition. The politician recommended the organization of the event to the Hungarian hunting community back in September 2011, he announced it at the 2015 FeHoV, and at the 2016 he already announced as a fact that the Government of Hungary also supports the project. The number of visitors to the World Hunting Exhibition set a record. The event lasted twenty days, the central location was visited by a total of 616 thousand people. The rural locations, where the programs were held until the end of 2021, were visited by around 1 million 420 thousand people until October 15. More than 60,000 students participated in the programs at the central location. 514 groups from the country's 386 settlements, 15-16 thousand people from Budapest visited the attractions; moreover, within the framework of the goodwill program, more than 2,300 tickets were requested by organizations helping people with disabilities.

References

External links
Zsolt Semjén's webpage
Datapage
Biography
Semjén: Rendszeresen imádkozom Gyurcsányért (Index interview)

|-

1962 births
Living people
Christian Democratic People's Party (Hungary) politicians
Government ministers of Hungary
Members of the Fourth Orbán Government
Members of the National Assembly of Hungary (1994–1998)
Members of the National Assembly of Hungary (2002–2006)
Members of the National Assembly of Hungary (2006–2010)
Members of the National Assembly of Hungary (2010–2014)
Members of the National Assembly of Hungary (2014–2018)
Members of the National Assembly of Hungary (2018–2022)
Members of the National Assembly of Hungary (2022–2026)
People involved in plagiarism controversies
Politicians from Budapest
Members of the fifth Orbán government